American Indian tribal recognition in the United States most often refers to the process of a tribe being recognized by the United States federal government, or to a person being granted membership to a federally recognized tribe. There are 574 federally recognized tribal governments in the United States. Non-Acknowledged Tribes are tribes which have no federal designation as sovereign entities. This is not to be confused with recognition of Native Americans in the US which are defined by the BIA as any descendant of the Indigenous peoples of the Americas which is a US citizen. Federally Non-Recognized tribes refers to a subgroup of non-acknowledged tribes which had some sort of recognition by the British prior to the formation of the United States or by the United States but which were determined by the government to no longer exist as an Indian tribe or no longer meet the criteria for a nation to nation status.

The United States recognizes the right of these tribes to self-government and supports their tribal sovereignty and self-determination. These tribes possess the right to establish the legal requirements for membership. They may form their own government, enforce laws (both civil and criminal), tax, license and regulate activities, zone, and exclude people from tribal territories. Limitations on tribal powers of self-government include the same limitations applicable to states; for example, neither tribes nor states have the power to make war, engage in foreign relations, or coin money.

Legal definitions of Indian abound; according to a 1978 congressional survey, there were upwards of 33 separate definitions of "Indian" used in federal legislation. The number of definitions increased when tribal enrollment statutes were included. U.S. Government agencies may have varied definitions of "Indian." For example, the National Center for Health Statistics currently assigns the mother's race to a child born to parents of different "races". When people give multiracial responses to questions of heritage, only the first race is entered.

The 1978 American Indian Religious Freedom Act uses a two-part definition which is especially influential. It defines an Indian as a person who belongs to an Indian Tribe, which in turn is a group that "is recognized as eligible for the special programs and services provided by the United States to Indians because of their status as Indians."

Historic judicial and legislative definitions

Federal courts have not universally required membership in federally recognized tribes for a person to be classified as Indian. At times a person's membership in a federally recognized tribe was not sufficient for classification as Indian in the eyes of the courts.

The Major Crimes Act of 1885 placed seven major crimes under federal jurisdiction if committed by a Native American in Native American Territory. The Department of Justice required that a defendant be an enrolled member of a tribe to be covered by the Major Crimes Act.

In his 1935 Memorandum to John Collier, Commissioner of Indian Affairs, the Assistant Solicitor, Felix S. Cohen, discussed the rights of a group of non-tribal Indians under the Indian Reorganization Act. This Act defined a person as Indian based on three criteria, tribal membership, ancestral descent, or blood quantum. (Cohen said of the group now known as the Lumbee Tribe of North Carolina, recognized by the state of North Carolina: "[Clearly this group is not a] federally recognized Indian tribe. Neither are the members of this group residents of an Indian reservation.")

In the 1930s when it was more involved in determining classification of American Indians, the federal government used five factors to certify individuals who claimed to be more than half-blood Indian: tribal rolls, testimony of the applicant, affidavits from people familiar with the applicant, findings of an anthropologist, and testimony of the applicant that he has retained "a considerable measure of Indian culture and habits of living." The attempt to use physical characteristics to define Indians created some paradoxical situations. In 1939, for example, the BIA sent Harvard anthropologist Carl Selzer to Robeson County, North Carolina to review the claims of the Lumbee, who were of mixed-race descent. Using methods of assessment then used in physical anthropology, but since discounted, "He measured their features and put a pencil in each Indian's hair, noting 'Indian' blood if the pencil slipped through and 'Negroid' if it did not. The absurd results of his study listed children as Indian while omitting their parents, and placing brothers and sisters on opposite sides of the half-blood line."

Terminated recognition

In the 1950s and 1960s, the federal government saw certain tribes as sufficiently capable of self-government, and thus "no longer in need of federal supervision." The government terminated its relationship with numerous tribes under this policy, including the Menominees of Wisconsin, and the Klamath of Oregon. Many tribes opposed this, and have sought restoration of recognition. Not all have received restoration and Brownell (2001) reports that the policy has "devastated" many of the groups. In particular, the tribes in California have been heavily affected by the termination era. For example, the Taylorsville Rancheria was established and participated in the IRA, but during the termination era the tribe's land was sold to Plumas county to be used for a park and roping club. The government failed to officially terminate the tribe through an act of congress, but the tribe was not included on the Federally Recognized tribes list. The Taylorsville Rancheria has been in limbo since that time and continues to struggle for their restored status as a recognized tribe.

Recent shift to "political" definition
Because continuing to determine Indian membership by racial criteria, such as blood quantum or Indian descent, would leave the government in a constitutionally indefensible position, it has attempted to change how its statutes and regulations provide for the distribution of benefits to Indians. Native American concerns over equal protection and tribal sovereignty have led the federal government to reduce its role as arbiter of race-based eligibility standards. This policy of allowing tribes self-determination on membership, as well as other aspects of their lives, has developed since the Nixon administration in the 1970s. Nixon said the goal should be "to strengthen the Indian's sense of autonomy without threatening his sense of community. And we must make it clear that Indians can become independent of Federal control without being cut off from Federal concern and Federal support."

The pivotal legislation of the era was the Indian Self-Determination and Education Assistance Act of 1975. This act began the government's process of transferring authority for administering federal grants and programs for Indians to tribal governments. Senator Daniel K. Inouye, Chairman of the Senate Select Committee on Indian Affairs, said in 1994 that, "Sovereignty, the inherent right of self-government and self-determination, is the focal point in all Indian issues."

The government has shifted to social constructs: "political" definitions by which legislation has defined Indians based on membership in federally recognized tribes. The government and many tribes prefer this definition because it allows the tribes to determine the meaning of "Indianness" in their own membership criteria. Some analysts criticize the federal government's role even in this limited way, as still setting certain conditions on the nature of membership criteria.

In some cases, an enrolled member of a federally recognized tribe may have no documented Native American "blood" (biological descent). Some of the Freedmen of the Cherokee Nation of Oklahoma used to be such members. Following the Civil War, the U.S. government's 1866 treaty with the defeated Cherokee, who had been Confederate allies, required them to free their slaves and to provide the freedmen with citizenship in the tribe. By recent referendum, the Cherokee Nation limited membership to only those people who could show descent from at least one Native American listed on the Dawes Rolls. This excluded nearly 2000 Cherokee Freedmen, who, with their ancestors, had been participating in the tribe for generations. Litigation on this matter continues.

The Indian Arts and Crafts Act of 1990 may be the only recent federal Indian legislation that was, at all stages of legislative deliberation, supported by Indians. This law required that only Indians be allowed to market their handicrafts as "Indian made" and be sold at Indian crafts fairs. This was to halt the economic loss to Indians due to questionable and fraudulent claims of this sort, which was estimated between $400 and $800 million a year. In the Act, Indian was described as "any individual who is a member of an Indian tribe; or for the purpose of this section is certified as an Indian artisan by an Indian tribe." An Indian tribe was defined more broadly than just to tribes with federal recognition, but also to "any Indian group that has been formally recognized as an Indian tribe by a State legislature or by a State commission or similar organization legislatively vested with State tribal recognition authority." The broadness sought in part to protect the civil liberties of those who have Indian heritage and culture, but are not tribal members. However, the definition was not broad enough to avoid disallowing many artists whose Indian background was not in doubt, including well-known Cherokee painter, Bert Seabourn.

The 1994 federal legislation, the American Indian Religious Freedom Act, gives another common definition, defining an Indian as one who belongs to an Indian tribe, which is a group that "is recognized as eligible for the special programs and services provided by the United States to Indians because of their status as Indians."

The result of there being multiple legal definitions of Indian is that one may be eligible to receive educational grants, but not health benefits, one may be eligible to be chief of a tribe but not to obtain a Bureau of Indian Affairs loan or an Indian scholarship to a state university.

Using federal laws to define "Indian" signals to some a continued government control over Indians, even as the government seeks to establish a sense of deference. Thus Indianness becomes a rigid legal term defined by the BIA, rather than an expression of tradition, history, and culture. Many groups claim descendants from tribes that predate European contact not federally recognized. According to Rennard Strickland, an Indian Law scholar, the federal government uses the process of recognizing groups to "divide and conquer" Indians: "the question of who is 'more' or 'most' Indian may draw people away from common concerns."

Recognition

Gaining federal recognition
In order to become a federally recognized, tribes must meet certain requirements and achieving these requirements can be extremely difficult. The Bureau of Indian affairs defines a federally recognized tribe as an American Indian or Alaska Native tribal entity that is recognized having a government-to-government relationship with the United States, with the responsibilities, powers, limitations, and obligations attached to that designation, and is eligible for funding and services from the Bureau of Indian Affairs. Moreover, according to the Bureau of Indian affairs and the Federally Recognized Indian Tribe list act, there are three ways that an Indian tribe may become federally recognized are: By act of congress, By the administrative procedures under 25 C.F.R Part 83, or by decision of a United States court. The Bureau also states that if a tribe’s relationship with the United States has been expressly terminated by congress, then it may not go by this Federal acknowledgment process, furthermore, the Federally Recognized Indian Tribe List Act also requires the secretary of the Interior to publish annually a list of the federally recognized tribes in the Federal Register

Today there are 574 groups (bands and tribes) recognized as Native American by the government. Those tribes which have already achieved federal recognition do not want the process made easier. Some spokesmen discuss what other kinds of groups might be encouraged, without encroaching on the recognized tribes. Cherokee Nation spokesman Mike Miller suggests that people with an interest in Indian culture can form heritage groups. Federally recognized tribes are suspicious of non-recognized tribes' efforts to gain acknowledgment, concerned that they may dilute already limited federal benefits. As casino gambling has raised tribal revenues dramatically, there is more competition by tribal groups to gain federal recognition and the right to operate gaming on reservations. Gaining recognition also is a way for Native American groups to assert their identity, their Indianness.

Tribes were originally recognized as legal parties through treaties, executive orders, or presidential proclamations. The 1934 Indian Reorganization Act played a major role in the development of the concept of federal recognition. It provided recognition to those tribes with which the government already had a relationship. Under its provisions, some non-federally recognized tribes were enabled to become federally recognized.

During the 1960s and early 1970s, dozens of groups that lacked federal acknowledgment came forward to demand their rights as Native peoples. In the east, groups like the Mashpee Wampanoag filed suit for lands lost in preceding generations. In the west, groups sought fishing rights. In the southeast, others came to demand the government recognize them as surviving aboriginal peoples. As federal tribal status allowed groups standing to bring claims and many came to see the injustice of denying acknowledgment to indigenous peoples, many parties came to acknowledge the need for more consistent procedures for recognizing tribes left outside the circle. With tribal input, the BIA created its Federal Acknowledgment Process in 1978. Currently known as the Office of Federal Acknowledgment, this entity is the main body charged with deciding which groups are eligible to secure status.

Acknowledgment criteria have been created by regulation based on statute. They are set by the Bureau of Indian Affairs' Branch of Acknowledgment and Research. Since the mid-1970s, representatives of federally recognized tribes have consulted with BIA on these criteria.

To be federally recognized, a group must meet the following:
"[S]ince 1900, it must comprise a distinct community and have existed as a community from historical times;
it must have political influence over its members;
it must have membership criteria; and
it must have membership that consists of individuals who descend from a historical Indian tribe and who are not enrolled in any other tribe." The existence of persistent political relationship as an aspect of tribal relations is also emphasized.

Blood Quantum and Gatekeeping of Native American identity 

Over the course of history, the definition and idea of an “Indian” has been altered by settler colonial society and by the United States government. The addition of blood quantum laws not only tore Native tribes apart, but it made it extremely difficult for most Native Americans to qualify as Indigenous after the disenrollment of many Native individuals. There were not any other laws that provided a definition for what an “Indian” was, which meant the decision of if an individual was “Native enough” was left entirely up to the courts. In the early 1910s the federal government used blood quantum to deny some mixed-race Native Americans land and the requirement was that an individual must possess at least One-quarter Native American blood to receive the lands. These Laws would further support ideal Native American in the eyes of settlers to "uphold white supremacy and dominance"  as stated by Maya Harmon in Blood Quantum and the White Gatekeeping of Native American identity

Recognition for individuals
The United States Census allows citizens to check any ethnicity without requirements of validation. Thus, the census allows individuals to self-identify as Indian, merely by checking the racial category, "Native American/Alaska Native". In 1990, about 1.8 million people self-identified in the census as American Indian. About 60 percent of those, or 1.14 million people, are enrolled in federally recognized tribes.

People who self-identify as Indian but are not a part of a federally recognized group often wish to join a recognized tribe. The tribal government, in the absence of some legal obligation which stipulates otherwise, has final jurisdiction over who is a member of the tribe. Holly Reckord, an anthropologist who heads the BIA Branch of Acknowledgment and Recognition, discusses the most common outcome for those who seek membership: "We check and find that they haven't a trace of Indian ancestry, yet they are still totally convinced that they are Indians. Even if you have a trace of Indian blood, why do you want to select that for your identity, and not your Irish or Italian? It's not clear why, but at this point in time, a lot of people want to be Indian."

Recently, federally recognized tribes have seen the number of enrolled members increase. In some cases this has been because of a revival of interest in Native American heritage and culture. The number of people who self-identify as Indians has been growing even more rapidly. Hastings Shade, the Cherokee Nation's deputy chief, talks of a Cherokee legend of a white snake that devours Indian land and people. Many generations later, a young Indian learns its ways and drives a stake through its heart. "In the end," the legend concludes, "only Indian blood will be left, and people will be lining up to try to prove they have Indian blood."

Disenrollment
Disenrollment can be defined as the process in which Native Americans lose citizenship with a tribe. In the case that a Native person is disenrolled from their tribe, they are essentially stripped of their government benefits and acceptance as a member of a federally recognized tribe, and they are also stripped of their identity as an individual, as implied in an article titled “Disenrollment Is a Tool of the Colonizers” published by Indian Country Today. An example of a tribe where hundreds of members were disenrolled is the Nooksack tribe where nearly 300 hundred members were disenrolled “The seven year saga has been well chronicled, particularly since 2016 when a tribal council faction refused to hold an election for four expired seats and incinerated the entire Nooksack government in an effort to forgo that election and carry out their mass disenrollment scheme”, Nooksack 306. The ultimate purpose of disenrollment is to dismantle Native tribes and destroy the identities of Native Individuals to make the re-enrollment process harder and to further add to the complexity of gaining recognition as a Native American in the United States, (Galanda, Gabriel).
An individual may be ejected by a tribe, sometimes for serious offenses, but sometimes, upon discovery that their claim is not well-founded.

Numerous disenrollments by small tribes with casino income are suspicious.

Several Native American communities have prohibited disenrollment.

Examples of disenrollment
Black Seminoles
Cahto Tribe  Rancheria disenrolled 33% of members after casino opened in 1995.
Cherokee freedmen controversy
Chitimacha tribe of Louisiana: Between 1904 and 1919, tribal members of mixed African and Native American ancestry were disenrolled from the Chitimacha tribe of Louisiana, and their descendants have since then been denied tribal membership.
Confederated Tribes of the Grand Ronde-in 2013 86 descendants of Tumulth disenrolled because ancestor is not on the restoration roll-he was executed by the US Army in 1855 (Note: Disenrollment reversed August 6, 2016)
Elem Promo Indian Colony - 132 members proposed for disenrollment (Note: Disenrollment action withdrawn March 30, 2017)
Hopland Band of Pomo Indians - 74 fully documented and legitimate descendants of a Hopland Distributee (Marian and William Wilder) were disenrolled for "errors in processing enrollment applications".
Luiseno Nation of California-9 disenrolled
Modoc Tribe of Oklahoma-15 disenrolled
Muscogee Creek Freedmen -filed suit July 2018 to regain citizenship
Northern Narragansett Tribe made up of disenrolled members of the Narragansett Nation of Rhode Island
Nooksack-306 members "disenrolled" because of ancestor Anne James (George)
Omaha Tribe of Nebraska-15 members disenrolled for blood quantum
Pala Band of Misson Indians-8 members disenrolled for blood quantum June 1, 2011 total of 154 disenrolled
Pechanga-236 disenrolled
Picayune Rancheria of the Chukchansi over 50 descendants of Jack Roan "disenrolled"
Redding Racheria-formal Tribal Chairman Edward Foreman and descendants "disenrolled" 2004 over question of mother's lineage
Robinson Ranchiera of Pomo Indians (California)-In 2017 "...reinstated several dozen members who were disenrolled nearly a decade ago by corrupt tribal leaders who left the tribe millions of dollars in debt."
Saginaw Chippewa-230 members disenrolled on grounds of collateral descent
San Pasqual Band-60 disenrolled in 2011
Snoqualmie-9 banished and 80 disenrolled
St Croix Chippewa-10 disenrolled for Blood quantium
In 2016 a website called "Stop Disenrollment" was set up by Native Peoples.
In 2017 it is reported that an estimated 9,000 members of 72 native tribes have been disenrolled
In 2020 it is estimated that nearly 10,000 members of 85 [out of 574 federally acknowledged tribes] have been disenrolled over 15 years.

State-recognized Indians
The process for federal recognition of a tribe always has been and is likely to remain complex and difficult for most Native tribes to achieve. However, some tribes have been able to gain State recognition meaning that these tribes are recognized by individual states for their various state government purposes. In 1924, Virginia’s Racial Integrity act was enforced and genealogical records by officials who enforced this act. The Racial Integrity Act had declared that “colored” and “white” people were the only people that existed in Virginia, however the consequences of this act has made it nearly impossible for these Indians to gain any kind of recognition in the future.

Some groups that are not federally recognized have still achieved state recognition. Various states, most in the East, have a recognition process independent of federal recognition. Some examples of state-recognized tribes are the Lumbee Tribe of North Carolina and the Houma Tribe of Louisiana.

Footnotes

Bibliography

Barrett, Barbara. (2007) "Two N.C. tribes fight for identity; Delegation split on Lumbee recognition" The News & Observer (Raleigh, North Carolina) April 19, 2007
Bonney, Rachel A. (1977) "The Role of AIM Leaders in Indian Nationalism". American Indian Quarterly, Vol. 3, No. 3. (Autumn, 1977), pp. 209–224.
Bordewich, Fergus M. (1996) Killing the White Man's Indian: Reinventing Native Americans at the End of the Twentieth Century. First Anchor Books, 
Brownell, Margo S. (2001) "Who is an Indian? Searching for an Answer to the Question at the Core of Federal Indian Law". Michigan Journal of Law Reform 34(1-2):275-320.
Carpenter, Cari. (2005) "Detecting Indianness: Gertrude Bonnin's Investigation of Native American Identity". Wíčazo Ša Review - Volume 20, Number 1, Spring 2005, pp. 139–159
Carter, Kent. (1988) "Wantabes and Outalucks: Searching for Indian Ancestors in Federal Records". Chronicles of Oklahoma 66 (Spring 1988): 99-104 (Accessed June 30, 2007 here)
Cohen, F. (1982) Handbook of Federal Indian law. Charlottesville: Bobbs-Merrill, 
Dyar, Jennifer. (2003) "Fatal Attraction: The White Obsession with Indianness". The Historian. June 2003. Vol 65 Issue 4 pages 817–836
Etheridge, Tiara. (2007) "Displacement, loss still blur American Indian identities" April 25, 2007 Wednesday, Oklahoma Daily, University of Oklahoma
Field, W. Les (with the Muwekma Ohlone Tribe). (2003) "Unacknowledged Tribes, Dangerous Knowledge, The Muwekma Ohlone and How Indian Identities Are 'Known.'" Wíčazo Ša Review 18.2 pages 79–94
Garroutte, Eva Marie. (2003) Real Indians: identity and the survival of Native America. University of California Press, 
Gercken-Hawkins, Becca (2003) "'Maybe you only look white:' Ethnic Authority and Indian Authenticity in Academia". The American Indian Quarterly 27.1&2 pages 200-202
Hall, Stuart. (1997) "The work of representation". In Representation: Cultural Representations and Signifying Practices, ed. Stuart Hall, 15–75. London: Sage Publications, 
Horse, Perry G. (2005) "Native American identity" New Directions for Student Services. Volume 2005, Issue 109, Pages 61 – 68
Lawrence, Bonita. (2003) "Gender, Race, and the Regulation of Native Identity in Canada and the United States: An Overview" Hypatia 18.2 pages 3–31
Miller, Mark Edwin. Forgotten Tribes: Unrecognized Indians and the Federal Acknowledgment Process. Lincoln: University of Nebraska Press, 2004.
Nagel, J. (1995) "Politics and the Resurgence of American Indian Ethnic Identity", American Sociological Review 60: 947–965.
Paredes, J. Anthony. (1995) "Paradoxes of Modernism and Indianness in the Southeast". American Indian Quarterly, Vol. 19, No. 3. (Summer, 1995), pp. 341–360.
Peroff, Nicholas C. (1997) "Indian Identity" The Social Science Journal, Volume 34, Number 4, pages 485–494.
Nicholas Peroff (2002) "Who is an American Indian?" Social Science Journal. Volume 39, Number 3, pages 349
Pierpoint, Mary. (2000) "Unrecognized Cherokee claims cause problems for nation". Indian Country Today. August 16, 2000 (Accessed May 16, 2007 here)
Porter, F.W. III (ed.) (1983). "Nonrecognized American Indian tribes: An historical and legal perspective". Occasional Paper Series No. 7. Chicago, IL: D'Arcy McNickle Center for the History of the American Indian, The Newberry Library.
Ray, S. Alan. A Race or a Nation? Cherokee National Identity and the Status of Freedmen's Descendants. Michigan Journal of Race and Law. Vol. 12, p. 387, 2007 (Accessible on SSRN as of March 21, 2008 A Race or a Nation? Cherokee National Identity and the Status of Freedmen's Descendants).
Russell, Steve. (2004) "Review of Real Indians: Identity and the Survival of Native America" PoLAR: Political and Legal Anthropology Review. May 2004, Vol. 27, No. 1, pp. 147–153
Russell, Steve (2002). "Apples are the Color of Blood". Critical Sociology Vol. 28, 1, 2002, p. 65
Schulz, Amy J. (1998) "Navajo Women and the Politics of Identity". Social Problems, Vol. 45, No. 3. (Aug., 1998), pp. 336–355.
Sheffield, Gail (1998) Arbitrary Indian: The Indian Arts and Crafts Act of 1990. University of Oklahoma Press 
Sturm, Circe. (1998) "Blood Politics, Racial Classification, and Cherokee National Identity: The Trials and Tribulations of the Cherokee Freedmen". American Indian Quarterly, Winter/Spring 1998, Vol 22. No 1&2 pgs 230-258
Thornton, Russell. (1992) The Cherokees: A Population History. University of Nebraska Press, 
Thornton, Russell. (1997) "Tribal Membership Requirements and the Demography of 'Old' and 'New' Native Americans". Population Research and Policy Review Vol. 16, Issue 1, p. 33 
"Census 2000 PHC-T-18. American Indian and Alaska Native Tribes in the United States: 2000" United States Census Bureau, Census 2000, Special Tabulation (Accessed May 27, 2007 here)
"State-Tribal Relations: Indian Tribe States", ncls.org, (2007) National Council of State Legislatures (Accessible as of July 16, 2007 here)

Recognition
United States federal Indian policy
Wampanoag